Patrick Ambrose (17 October 1928 – 22 February 2002) was a  professional football player and coach from Dublin, Ireland.

Signed by Jimmy Dunne from junior side Clontarf, he was associated with Shamrock Rovers from 1948 to 1973, firstly as a player and then as a coach.

He made his debut against Transport in Bray on 28 August 1949 in a Dublin City Cup game.

He was one of the club's best ever strikers. During his career at Rovers he scored 109 League goals which is a club record  . He was the leading scorer at the club in 1953–54, 1954–55, 1955–56 (20 goals) and 1960–61.

When Rovers won the title in 1953–54, their first title for fifteen years, Paddy scored 13 goals. Paddy won a League medal with Shamrock Rovers four times, in 1953–54, 1956–57, 1958–59 and 1963–64.

He played in six FAI Cup finals plus one replay and won four winner's medals in the following years, 1955, 1956, 1962 and 1964. Paddy made 6 appearances in European competition for Rovers.
 
The man who became famous for wearing the green and white hooped number nine shirt was capped by Ireland five times, scoring once, also earning two B caps and one amateur international cap for the Republic of Ireland national football team.

Paddy shared a testimonial with Gerry Mackey in May 1959.

The great service of Paddy Ambrose to Rovers was marked by the presentation of a gold medal by the directors. This was a medal which was presented to any Rovers player who had 15 consecutive years service to the club.

At the end of the 2012 League of Ireland season Ambrose is joint thirty third in the all-time League of Ireland goalscoring list with 109 league goals

Honours
 League of Ireland: 4
 Shamrock Rovers 1953–54, 1956–57, 1958–59, 1963–64
 FAI Cup: 4
 Shamrock Rovers 1955, 1956, 1962, 1964

References

 The Hoops by Paul Doolan and Robert Goggins

External links
Paddy Ambrose and Tommy Eglington

Association footballers from County Dublin
Association football forwards
Republic of Ireland association footballers
Republic of Ireland international footballers
Republic of Ireland B international footballers
Shamrock Rovers F.C. players
Shamrock Rovers F.C. managers
League of Ireland managers
League of Ireland players
1928 births
2002 deaths
League of Ireland XI players
Republic of Ireland football managers